WWKC (104.9 FM) is a country music radio station outside Caldwell, Ohio, licensed to AVC Communications, Inc. The station broadcasts with a power of 3,000 Watts and is known as "KC105" to listeners. KC105 has been using the call sign WWKC since 1989. Before then, it used the call sign WNQV.

External links
WWKC official website
AVC Communications website

WKC
Country radio stations in the United States